Sue Ann Alderson (born September 11, 1940), an American children's novelist, was born in 1940 in New York City. She earned a B.A. in English from Ohio State University in 1962 and an M.A. in English literature from the University of California, Berkeley in 1967. Alderson moved to Vancouver, British Columbia in 1967 where she taught at Simon Fraser University. She also was a professor in the Creative Writing Department at the University of British Columbia. 

Alderson writes for various ages and in different genres. Some common themes in her writing, however, are "the empowerment of children, the joys of animals and nature, the pleasure of cooperative projects and the value of individuality and imagination."

Publications
A children's novelist, she has written 17 novels.  Her most popular books is Ida and the Wool smugglers; according to WorldCat, the book is held in 543 libraries 

1974 Bonnie McSmithers, You're Driving Me Dithers
translated into French by Fiona Garrick as Anne-Marie Maginol, tu me rends folle
1977 The Finding Princess
1977 The Adventures of Prince Paul
1977 Hurry Up, Bonnie
1979 Bonnie McSmithers Is At It Again1983 The Not Impossible Summer1983 Comet's Tale1984 The Something in Thurlo Darby's House1987 Ida and the Wool Smugglers1989 Maybe You Had to be There, by Duncan1990 Chapter One1992 Sure as Strawberries1993 A Ride for Martha1995 Ten Mondays for Lots of Boxes1997 Pond Seasons
1999 Wherever Bears Be  (Sheila A. Egoff Children's Literature Prize)
2007 The Eco Diary of Karin Singer

References

American children's writers
Living people
1940 births
Writers from New York City
Ohio State University College of Arts and Sciences alumni
UC Berkeley College of Letters and Science alumni
Academic staff of Simon Fraser University
Academic staff of the University of British Columbia
American expatriates in Canada